Jasper, Texas is a 2003 American made-for-television drama film directed by Jeffrey W. Byrd. The teleplay by Jonathan Estrin is based on a true story and focuses on the aftermath of a crime in which three white men from the small town of Jasper, Texas, killed African American James Byrd Jr. by dragging him behind their pickup truck.

The film was shown at the Philadelphia International Film Festival before being broadcast by Showtime on June 8, 2003.

Plot
In Jasper, Texas, in June 1998, three self-proclaimed white supremacists chain James Byrd Jr., to the back of their pickup truck and drag him to his death over three miles of country road. When the town is forced to deal with an onslaught of media coverage that thrusts it into the collective conscience of the entire country and the arrival of contentious members of the Ku Klux Klan, and the Black Panthers, the once peaceful relationship between its white and black citizens is subjected to tension. Trying to maintain peace in the community as the trial of the three perpetrators commences are black mayor R.C. Horn and white sheriff Billy Rowles, neither of whom is prepared to handle all the negative publicity. Justice is served when two of the men are condemned to death and the third is sentenced to life in prison.

Cast
Jon Voight as Sheriff Billy Rowles
Louis Gossett Jr. as Mayor R.C. Horn
Ron White as Assistant District Attorney Guy James Gray
Gary Hudson as Defense Attorney 'Sonny' Cribbs
Joe Morton as Walter Diggles 
Kate Trotter as Jamie Rowles
Demore Barnes as Ricky Horn 
Karen Robinson as Mary Horn
Michelle Moffat as Mamie Horn
Bokeem Woodbine as Khalid X
Emily Yanc as Stella Byrd
Cherion Drakes as Clair Byrd
Kevin Hanchard as Thurman Byrd
Blu Mankuma as James Byrd Sr.   
Roy T. Anderson as James Byrd Jr.
Michael McLachlan as Bill King
Eric Peterson as Old Mr. King
Eugene Clark as Don Clark
David Eisner as Mike Bradford
Michael Ferguson as William Hoover
Jeff Topping as Russell Brewer
Toby Proctor as Sean Berry
J.D. Nicholsen as Mike Lout
Conrad Bergschneider as 'Moe' Johnson
Holly Lewis as Michelle Chapman
Victoria Snow as Nancy Nicholson
Leah Renee as Brandi Eggleson
Marium Carvell as Gloria Mays
Dean McKenzie as Mr. Nelson
Martin Doyle as Mr. Powell
Craig Eldridge as Dr. Brown
Andre Mayers as Sergeant Carter
Jumaane Ford as Lieutenant
Wayne Ward as Deputy
Sandra Caldwell as Norva
Samantha Bee as Kathy
James Millington as Catholic Priest
Kedar Brown as Reverend
Neil Crone as Principal

Critical reception
David Wiegand of the San Francisco Chronicle said, "There's nothing fatally wrong with the film, but the muddled, overstuffed script and sometimes cheesy direction short-circuit the emotional potential of the treatment of James Byrd Jr.'s brutal dragging death five years ago in a small Texas town . . . The better TV films offer commentary and perspective subtly, through careful characterization and plot development. Jasper, Texas doesn't quite do that. Despite great performances from Voight and Gossett, the film trips over its own simplistic analysis of what 'getting along' between the races really means."

Laura Fries of Variety called the film "an introspective but somewhat Hollywoodized treatment" and continued, "The director's focus is very personal. Although he doesn't linger on details of the court case, the murder is presented in full-color detail. It is handled almost clinically, but not without sensitivity. To dance around the facts would be too great a disservice. To exploit the sensational nature of the crime also would be wrong. Instead, Byrd puts his trust into his very capable cast."

Sam Adams of Philadelphia City Paper thought the film was "a standard-issue docudrama whose pat resolution doesn't dredge up anything like the national horror of Byrd's murder."

Awards and nominations
Screenwriter Jonathan Estrin was nominated for the Humanitas Prize. The film was nominated for the NAACP Image Award for Outstanding Television Movie, Mini-Series or Dramatic Special but lost to D.C. Sniper: 23 Days of Fear, and Lou Gossett, Jr. was nominated for the NAACP Image Award for Outstanding Actor in a Television Movie, Mini-Series or Dramatic Special but lost to Charles S. Dutton in D.C. Sniper.

DVD release
Showtime Entertainment released the film on DVD on February 3, 2004. It is in fullscreen format with audio tracks in English and Spanish.

Filmed
Portions of the film, including the intown scene, were shot in Beaverton, Ontario, Canada.

References

External links

2003 television films
2003 films
2003 drama films
Drama films based on actual events
Films set in Texas
Showtime (TV network) films
Films set in 1998
Films about racism
Films about the Ku Klux Klan
Films directed by Jeffrey W. Byrd
American drama television films
2000s American films